The Khyex River is a tributary of the Skeena River in the North Coast Regional District of the province of British Columbia, Canada.

Almost all of the Khyex River's watershed is contained within the Khyex Conservancy.

The Khyex River's watershed is within the asserted territory of the Tsimshian Lax-kw'alaams First Nation and the Metlakatla First Nation.

Geography
The Khyex River originates in high, glaciated peaks of the Kitimat Range, such as Mount Campagnolo and Khyex Tower. The river flows south to the Skeena River, collecting a number of tributary streams, the largest of which is Arden Creek.

The Khyex River's watershed's land cover is classified as 32.4% Barren, 31.8% Coniferous, 12.4% Grassland, and 10.3% Snow/Glacier.

The Indian reserves Kyex 64, Khyex 8, Ksagwisgwas 62,  and Ksagwisgwas 63 are located along the Khyex River.

Natural history
The Khyex River supports of runs of salmonids including Chinook salmon, chum salmon, coho salmon, pink salmon, and steelhead trout. The river also supports runs of eulachon.

See also
List of British Columbia rivers

References 

North Coast Regional District
Rivers of British Columbia
Rivers of the Kitimat Ranges
Rivers of the North Coast of British Columbia
Skeena Country
Tsimshian
Range 5 Coast Land District